Wyoming Highway 59 (WYO 59) is a  north–south state highway that runs from Douglas to the Montana–Wyoming State Line, where the roadway continues as Montana Highway 59.

Route description

Douglas

Wyoming Highway 59 begins its southern end at an intersection with I-25 BUS/US 20 BUS/US 26 BUS/US 87 BUS (W. Yellowstone Highway), the northern terminus of Wyoming Highway 94 (Esterbrook Road), and exit 140 of Interstate 25 in Douglas.
Past WYO 93, Highway 59 travels around the northwest side Douglas and acts as a bypass. At  there is a junction with Wyoming Highway 59C, a spur of WYO 59 and the former routing of WYO 59 through Douglas.

Douglas to Gillette

Wyoming Highway 59 along its route between Gillette and Douglas to some is one of the most desolate or barren place in the country. Bill consists of a hotel and diner for Union Pacific Railroad employees who take mandatory rests in the town Between Bill and Wright, WYO 59 leaves Converse County and enters Campbell County.

At , Highway 59 intersects Wyoming Highway 450 just south of Wright. WYO 450 heads east from here to Newcastle. WYO 387  travels west to Midwest and Edgerton. Wright is a town in Campbell County where settlement began in the 1970s, with the creation of the Black Thunder Coal Mine, the largest mine in the Powder River Basin and most productive mine in the United States. The town itself was incorporated in 1985. Established as a mining town, the majority of people living in Wright are employed by the various mines that surround it.

From Wright to Gillette there are no intersections with major highways and the landscape consists of buttes covered with short grasses. At  into its route, Highway 59 enters Gillette as South Douglas Highway.

Gillette

Gillette is a city and county seat of Campbell County. It is a small city centrally located in an area that is vital to the development of vast quantities of American coal, oil, and coal bed methane gas, as a result, the city calls itself the "Energy Capital of the Nation".

WYO 59 turns west onto 2nd Street and runs concurrent with US 14/US 16/I-90 BUS. Around , WYO 59 begins to turn north and intersects Wyoming Highway 50 (Skyline Drive). Wyoming Highway 50 used to be routed down 4J Road into Gillette. Sometime between 1980 and 1993, WYO 50 was transferred to Skyline Drive, which provides easier access to Interstate 90. At the intersection with WYO 50, I-90 BUS turns west to run concurrent with Highway 50 to Interstate 90. WYO 59 continues north concurrent with US 14 and US 16 out of Gillette.

East of Gillette
At , and northwest of Gillette, WYO 59 ends its concurrency with US 14/US 16 at a four-way intersection east of the Gillette–Campbell County Airport. Highway 59 turns east onto its own routing north, US 14/US 16 continue north on their routing west, and Airport Road heads west into the Gillette–Campbell County Airport.

Weston is an unincorporated community in northern Campbell County, along the upper Little Powder River on the southeastern edge of the Thunder Basin National Grassland. Even though Weston is unincorporated, it has a post office, with the ZIP code of 82731.

For the rest of the way through Campbell County, Highway 59 parallels Little Powder River that lies to the highway's east all the way to the state line.
Wyoming Highway 59 ends at the Montana-Wyoming state line. The highway continues north as Montana Highway 59 until its junction with Montana Highway 200 at Jordan, Montana.

Wyoming Highway 59 follows State Control Number P-43 for its entire length.

History

Wyoming Highway 59 was formerly numbered Wyoming Highway 185 prior to 1936. From 1936 and 1945, it was known as Wyoming Highway 387. After 1945, the road was known as Wyoming Highway 59. U.S. Route 185 was commissioned in 1926 to run from Cheyenne to Orin. It was proposed that US 185 continue north to Gillette, via US 20 between Orin and Douglas, and via Wyoming Highway 59 between Douglas and Gillette. But the road now carrying WYO 59 did not exist. So when Highway 59 was constructed in the late 1920s and early 1930s, it carried the designation US 185. After the Great Recommissioning of 1936, Wyoming 185 was renumbered to Wyoming 387, since the route directly connected to the new U.S. 87, not U.S. 85. In 1945, the 387 designation was changed to WYO 59.

Major intersections

Wyoming Highway 59 Connector

WYO 59C is the original alignment of Wyoming Highway 59 through Douglas. The route begins at WYO 59 and heads south 0.45 of a mile to meet WYO 59 (Fourth St.)

See also

References

 Official 2003 State Highway Map of Wyoming

External links 

 Wyoming State Routes 000-099
 WYO 59 – I-25 Bus/US 20 Bus/US 26 Bus/US 87 Bus/WYO 94 to WYO 93
 WYO 59 – WYO 93 to WYO 450
 WYO 59 – WYO 450 to WYO 387
 WYO 59 – WYO 387 to I-90
 WYO 59 – I-90 to I-90 Bus/US 14/US 16
 WYO 59 – I-90 Bus/US 14/US 16 to I-90 Bus/WYO 50
 WYO 59 – I-90 Bus/WYO 50 to US 14/US 16
 WYO 59 – US 14/US 16 to MT 59/Montana State Line
 City of Douglas webpage
 Town of Wright webpage
 City of Gillette webpage
 Thunder Basin National Grassland – Federal website

Transportation in Converse County, Wyoming
Transportation in Campbell County, Wyoming
059